This article is about the particular significance of the year 1703 to Wales and its people.

Incumbents
Lord Lieutenant of North Wales (Lord Lieutenant of Anglesey, Caernarvonshire, Denbighshire, Flintshire, Merionethshire, Montgomeryshire) – Hugh Cholmondeley, 1st Earl of Cholmondeley (10 June – 5 November 1702)
Lord Lieutenant of South Wales (Lord Lieutenant of Glamorgan, Brecknockshire, Cardiganshire, Carmarthenshire, Monmouthshire, Pembrokeshire, Radnorshire) – Thomas Herbert, 8th Earl of Pembroke

Bishop of Bangor –  John Evans
Bishop of Llandaff – William Beaw
Bishop of St Asaph – Edward Jones (until 10 May); George Hooper (from 13 October)
Bishop of St Davids – vacant

Events
30 March - Catherine Price, sister of Richard Price, marries William Thomas of Cefn Ydfa, Llangynwyd; they would become the parents of Ann Maddocks.
July - John Hanbury II marries Bridget Ayscough, the eldest daughter of Sir Edward Ayscough of Stallingbough, Lincolnshire. Sir Edward's only son having died, Bridget inherits a share of his estates and brings a fortune of £10,000 to the marriage. 
20 July - Sir Roger Mostyn, 3rd Baronet, marries Lady Essex Finch, daughter of the Earl of Nottingham.
28 August - Thomas Windsor, 1st Viscount Windsor, marries Charlotte Herbert, daughter of Philip Herbert, 7th Earl of Pembroke, and widow of John Jeffreys, 2nd Baron Jeffreys
date unknown
Baptist leader Thomas Griffiths and a small group of followers settle at Welsh Tract, Delaware, where they found the Welsh Tract Baptist church.

Arts and literature

New books
James Owen - Moderation a Virtue
Ellis Wynne - Gweledigaetheu y Bardd Cwsc
Pasc y Christion (translation of a work by Thomas Doolittle)

Music
Thomas Baddy - hymns appended to Pasc y Christion

Births
2 February - Richard Morris, one of the celebrated Morris brothers of Anglesey (d. 1779)
probable - Henry Herbert, 1st Earl of Powis (d. 1772)

Deaths
10 May - Edward Jones, Bishop of St Asaph, 62
16 July - Robert Brudenell, 2nd Earl of Cardigan, 96

See also
1703 in Scotland

References

1700s in Wales